Bentonville West High School  is a public high school for students in grades nine through twelve located in Centerton, Arkansas. Founded in 2016, with a current enrollment of 2,158 students (2021-2022), Bentonville West High School is one of the two high schools in Bentonville School District.
The school includes a football stadium that cost about $3.7 million to build.

Communities zoned to Bentonville West High include: much of north-east Bentonville, much of Centerton and Highfill, and small portions of Cave Springs and Rogers.

References

External links

2016 establishments in Arkansas
Public high schools in Arkansas
Schools in Benton County, Arkansas